Ísafjarðarbær is a municipality of Iceland in the Westfjords region, created in 1996 from Flateyrarhreppur, Ísafjarðarkaupstaður, Mosvallahreppur, Mýrahreppur, Suðureyrarhreppur and Þingeyrarhreppur.

Geography
The principal settlement is Ísafjörður, others being Hnífsdalur, Flateyri, Suðureyri and Þingeyri.

Education
 University Centre of the Westfjords — a higher education institute in Ísafjörður
 Flateyri Folk High School — a folk high school in Flateyri
 Menntaskólinn á Ísafirði — a gymnasium in Ísafjörður

Sports
Local football club Vestri plays in the country's second tier as of 2022. They play their home games at the Torfnesvöllur in Ísafjörður.

Transport
The municipality is served by Ísafjörður Airport.

Twin towns – sister cities

Ísafjarðarbær is twinned with:
 Joensuu, Finland
 Kaufering, Germany
 Linköping, Sweden
 Runavík, Faroe Islands
 Tønsberg, Norway

References

External links
Official website 

Municipalities of Iceland
Westfjords